Mereoni Vibose (26 April 1951 – 27 January 2018) was a Fijian female track and field athlete who competed in the discus throw and javelin throw. She won nine South Pacific Games medals from 1969 to 1991 and set the Fijian record for javelin and discus at the National Athletics Championships. Vibose was inducted into the Fiji Sports Hall of Fame in 1998. She represented her country internationally at the World Championships in Athletics and at the Commonwealth Games.

Biography
Vibose was born on 26 April 1951. She grew up in Nadroga, Fiji and was an athlete during her time at Adi Cakobau School.

In national championships, Vibose won 2 gold medals in javelin and discus each at the 1983 and 1987 National Athletics Championships in Fiji. During the championships, Vibose set the Fijian discus record in 1983 with 47.76 m and the Fijian javelin record in 1987 with 53.18 m. Alternatively, Vibose won nine South Pacific Games medals during her career. Her first South Pacific medals were a silver medal in the javelin and discus events at the 1969 South Pacific Games. Overall, Vibose won a total of nine medals at the South Pacific games.

Outside of the South Pacific, Vibose competed at the 1974 Commonwealth Games and the 1982 Commonwealth Games but did not medal. The following year, Vibose competed in the 1983 World Championships in Athletics in the javelin and discus events. After competing at the 1987 World Championships in Athletics in javelin, Vibose's final IAAF event was at the 1990 Oceania Athletics Championships where she won a bronze in discus and a gold in javelin. Vibose retired the following year in 1991. After her retirement, Vibose returned to athletics to compete in the 2016 World Masters Athletics Championships. Her best performance at the World Masters was fourth place in the javelin event.

In 1998, Vibose was inducted into the Fiji Sports Hall of Fame.

Vibose died on 27 January 2018 in Sigatoka, Fiji.

References

External links

1951 births
2018 deaths
Fijian female athletes
Fijian discus throwers
Fijian javelin throwers
Female discus throwers
Female javelin throwers
Commonwealth Games competitors for Fiji
Athletes (track and field) at the 1974 British Commonwealth Games
Athletes (track and field) at the 1982 Commonwealth Games
World Athletics Championships athletes for Fiji
People from Nadroga-Navosa Province